The Lovers of Lisbon is a 1955 French drama film directed by Henri Verneuil and starring Daniel Gélin, Françoise Arnoul, Trevor Howard and Betty Stockfeld. Two French exiles in Lisbon fall in love after each has murdered their respective spouse. It was based on a novel by Joseph Kessel.

The film's sets were designed by the art director Jean d'Eaubonne.

The soundtrack included the Portuguese singer Amália Rodrigues singing "Solidão" which is the initial version of what is popular as "Canção do Mar", a song written by Frederico de Brito and Ferrer Trindade.

Cast
 Daniel Gélin as Pierre Roubier
 Françoise Arnoul as Kathleen Dinver
 Trevor Howard as Inspector Lewis
 Marcel Dalio as Porfirio
 Amália Rodrigues as Amália
 Jacques Moulières as Manuel
 Ginette Leclerc as Maria
 Georges Chamarat as L'avocat
 Betty Stockfeld as Maisie

References

External links

Les Amants du Tage on Films De France

1955 films
French drama films
1955 drama films
1950s French-language films
Films directed by Henri Verneuil
Lisbon in fiction
Films set in Lisbon
Films based on French novels
French black-and-white films
1950s French films